Tooth Peak is a small sharp peak on the north end of Sculpture Mountain in the upper Rennick Glacier. Named for its tooth-like shape by the Northern Party of New Zealand Geological Survey Antarctic Expedition (NZGSAE), 1962–63.

Mountains of Victoria Land
Pennell Coast